The Sanremo Music Festival 1992 was the 42nd annual Sanremo Music Festival, held at the Teatro Ariston in Sanremo, province of Imperia between 26 and 29 February 1992 and broadcast by Rai 1.

The show was presented by Pippo Baudo, assisted by  Milly Carlucci, Brigitte Nielsen and Alba Parietti.

The winner of the Big Artists section was Luca Barbarossa with the ballad "Portami a ballare", while the folk group Nuova Compagnia di Canto Popolare won the Critics Award with the song "Pe' dispietto". The couple Aleandro Baldi and Francesca Alotta won the Newcomers section with the song "Non amarmi".

Participants and results

Big Artists

Newcomers

References 

Sanremo Music Festival by year
1992 in Italian music 
1992 in Italian television 
1992 music festivals